Letlhabile Community Radio is a South African community radio station based in the North West.

Coverage areas 
Mabopane
Brits
Sun City
Koster
Rustenburg
Ga-Rankuwa
Hartebeespoort
Olievenhoutbosh

Broadcast languages
Afrikaans
Xhosa
Tswana
North Sotho
Zulu
English

Broadcast time
24/7

Target audience
African language speaking listeners in community
LSM Groups 1 - 6
Age Group 18 - 50+

Programme format
50% Talk
50% Music

Listenership Figures

References

External links
 Official Mobile Website
 SAARF Website

Community radio stations in South Africa
Mass media in North West (South African province)